Newtown is the name of some places in the U.S. state of Pennsylvania:
 Newtown, Bucks County, Pennsylvania
 Newtown Township, Bucks County, Pennsylvania
 Newtown, Schuylkill County, Pennsylvania
 Newtown Township, Delaware County, Pennsylvania

See also 
 Newton Township, Lackawanna County, Pennsylvania
 North Newton Township, Cumberland County, Pennsylvania
 South Newton Township, Cumberland County, Pennsylvania